Carl Christoph Conrad Rangenier (December 17, 1829, in Hanover – October 20, 1895, in Bautzen) was a German sculptor, best remembered for his sculpture of George I of Great Britain at Guelph Castle in 1862, and the altar crucifix for the Evangelical Lutheran parish church in Graste in 1864 under Conrad Wilhelm Hase.

References 

1829 births
1895 deaths
German sculptors